The Toronto Nationals were a Canadian professional soccer team in Toronto, Ontario that competed in the original Canadian Professional Soccer League in 1983. They folded mid-way through the season and were immediately replaced by a successor team known as simply Toronto, which also folded after one game, a week later.

History

Their first match was played on May 21, which was the first game of the CPSL, in which they defeated FC Inter-Montréal by a score of 2-1 at Varsity Stadium, with a crowd of 3,860. 

However, only five weeks into the season, on June 18, the team folded, however, the league announced that new owners would take over the club and form a new replacement franchise, known simply as Toronto on June 20. 

On June 26, the reformed club faced the Hamilton Steelers, losing 3-2, but the new Toronto team folded immediately after this match, ending the franchise for good after new financial backers could not be found.

Season

Notable players
The following players played for the Nationals:

References

Defunct soccer clubs in Canada
Nationals
1983 establishments in Ontario
1983 disestablishments in Ontario
Association football clubs established in 1983
Association football clubs disestablished in 1983